Love Like Crazy is the debut studio album by American country music artist Lee Brice. It was released on June 8, 2010, via Curb Records. Prior to the album's release, Brice charted three singles: "She Ain't Right," "Happy Endings" and "Upper Middle Class White Trash." The album's title track debuted in August 2009. The album's second single "Beautiful Every Time" released to radio on October 25, 2010.

Critical reception
Stephen Thomas Erlewine of Allmusic gave the album a two-and-a-half star rating out of five, criticizing the "pedestrian" production, but saying that Brice showed an "ability to seem like your own local boy made good." Giving it one-and-a-half stars out of five, Karlie Justus of Engine 145 thought that most of the songs were formulaic and the production "unpredictably jarring." Bobby Peacock of Roughstock was more positive, giving it four stars out of five. He thought that the songwriting was "cohesive" and that "Brice's irrefutable singing and songwriting talents come through clearly."

Track listing

Personnel
Compiled from liner notes.

 Tim Akers — Hammond B-3 organ , keyboards 
 Travis Bettis — electric guitar 
 Steve Brewster — drums 
 Lee Brice — lead vocals, background vocals 
 Jim "Moose" Brown — keyboards , Hammond B-3 organ 
 Pat Buchanan — electric guitar 
 Tom Bukovac — acoustic guitar 
 Gary Burnette — acoustic guitar 
 Perry Coleman — background vocals 
 J. T. Corenflos — electric guitar 
 Chip Davis — background vocals 
 Dan Dugmore — steel guitar 
 Tony Harrell — piano , keyboards , Hammond B-3 organ 
 Rich Herring — acoustic guitar 
 Dennis Holt — drums 
 Buddy Hyatt — keyboards 
 Kyle Jacobs — background vocals 
 Mike Johnson — steel guitar 
 Jamie Kenney — piano , keyboards , Hammond B-3 organ 
 Jerry Kimbrough — electric guitar 
 Jeff King — electric guitar 
 Troy Lancaster — electric guitar 
 Chris Leuzinger — acoustic guitar , electric guitar 
 Jon McElroy — electric guitar 
 Pat McGrath — acoustic guitar 
 Steve Mackey — bass guitar 
 Gale Mayes — background vocals 
 Greg Morrow — drums 
 Gordon Mote — piano 
 Duncan Mullins — bass guitar 
 Russ Pahl — steel guitar 
 Garrett Parris — banjo , programming , background vocals 
 Angela Primm — background vocals 
 Brian Pruitt — drums 
 Kylie Sackley — background vocals 
 Scotty Sanders — steel guitar 
 Reggie Smith — Wurlitzer electric piano , Hammond B-3 organ 
 Jimmie Lee Sloas — bass guitar 
 Bryan Sutton — acoustic guitar 
 Bobby Terry — steel guitar 
 Ryan Wariner — electric guitar 
 Biff Watson — acoustic guitar 
 Lonnie Wilson — drums 
 Jonathan Yudkin — strings

Chart performance

Album
Love Like Crazy debuted on the U.S. Billboard 200 at No. 44 and at No. 9 on the U.S. Billboard Top Country Albums chart. As of July 24, 2010, the album has sold 32,357 copies.

Year-end charts

Singles

Certifications

References

2010 debut albums
Curb Records albums
Lee Brice albums
Albums produced by Doug Johnson (record producer)